Patricia Stich (born January 1, 1940) is an American actress, also credited as Pat Stich. Patricia Stich has appeared in many supporting roles on television, films and commercials. Her credits include Halls of Anger (1970) and The Loners (1972).

Filmography

Film

Television film

Television Series

References

1940 births
American television actresses
Living people
American film actresses
21st-century American women